Melton is a Scottish surname, and is derived from Anglo-Saxon (Old English) medeltone or meltuna, from the Old English words middel, meaning "middle" or "between two places", and tun, meaning "settlement".

Notable people with the surname

A
Annette Melton (born 1985), Australian actress
Arthur Melton (1906–1978), American psychologist

B
Babe Melton (1898–??), American baseball player
Barry Melton (born 1947), American musician
Bill Melton (born 1945), American baseball player
Bo Melton (born 1999), American football player
Bryant Melton (born 1940), American politician
Buck Melton (1923–2014), American politician

C
Carl D. Melton (1927–2016), American politician and judge
Charles Melton (disambiguation), multiple people
Cliff Melton (1912–1986), American baseball player

D
Darrio Melton, American politician
Dave Melton (1928–2008), American baseball player
De'Anthony Melton (born 1998), American basketball player
Douglas A. Melton (born 1953), American investigator
Dustin Melton (born 1995), Zimbabwean-South African cricketer

E
Eddie Melton (born 1980/1981), American politician
Emory Melton (1923–2015), American politician

F
Florence Melton (1911–2007), American inventor
Frank Melton (1949–2009), American politician

H
Harold Melton (born 1966), American judge
Henry Melton (born 1986), American football player
H. Keith Melton, American intelligence historian
Howell W. Melton (1923–2015), American lawyer and judge

J
Jacob Melton (born 2000), American baseball player
James Melton (1904–1961), American singer
J. Gordon Melton (born 1942), American religious scholar
John Melton (??–1640), English politician and author
Jonathan Melton, American lawyer and politician
Jovan Melton, American politician
Justin Melton (born 1987), Filipino-American basketball player

K
Kate Melton (born 1992), American actress

L
Lou Alta Melton (1895–1974), American civil engineer

M
Matthew Melton (born 1982), American musician
Mel Melton, American musician
Mitchell Melton (1943–2013), American politician

P
Parvati Melton (born 1989), Indian model
Patrick Melton (born 1975), American screenwriter

R
Richard Huntington Melton (born 1935), American ambassador
Rube Melton (1917–1971), American baseball player

S
Sean Melton (born 1994), American artistic gymnast
Sid Melton (1917–2011), American actor
Steve Melton (born 1978), English footballer
Steve Melton (businessman) (born 1962), English businessman

T
Terrence Melton (born 1977), American football player

W
William Melton (disambiguation), multiple people

See Also
Senator Melton (disambiguation), a disambiguation page for Senators surnamed "Melton"

English-language surnames